The Shamakhi 2021–22 season is the clubs twenty-first season in the Azerbaijan Premier League, during which they changed their name from Keşla to Shamakhi.

Season events
On 2 June, Turan Valizade's loan from Neftçi was extended for an additional season.

On 24 June, Keşla announced the signings of Oumar Goudiaby from Shkupi and Aldair Neto from Pelister.

On 1 July, Keşla announced the signings of Amil Yunanov from Sabail and Felipe Santos from Maribor.

On 9 July, Keşla announced the signing of Karim Diniyev from Zira.

On 27 December, Keşla announced that Anatole Abang and Nijat Gurbanov had left the club after their contracts had expired, whilst Oumar Goudiaby and John Kamara left the club by mutual consent.

On 29 December, Keşla announced the signing of Fahmin Muradbayli on loan from Neftçi for the remainder of the season, whilst Azer Salahli joined Neftçi on a permanent deal.

On 13 January, Franco Flores returned to the club, signing a contract until the end of the season.

On 24 January, Mijuško Bojović left the club by mutual consent.

On 3 February, Keşla announced the signing of Nathan Oduwa on a contract until the end of the season.

On 6 April, the Azerbaijan Premier League approved the clubs name change from Keşla FK to Shamakhi FK.

Squad

Out on loan

Transfers

In

Loans in

Out

Released

Friendlies

Competitions

Overview

Premier League

Results summary

Results by round

Results

League table

Azerbaijan Cup

UEFA Europa Conference League

Qualifying rounds

Squad statistics

Appearances and goals

|-
|colspan="14"|Players away on loan:
|-
|colspan="14"|Players who left Keşla during the season:

|}

Goal scorers

Clean sheets

Disciplinary record

References

External links 
 Inter Baku at Soccerway.com

Shamakhi FK seasons
Azerbaijani football clubs 2021–22 season
Keşla